Operation Astonia was the codename for an Allied attack on the German-held Channel port of Le Havre in France, during the Second World War. The city had been declared a Festung (fortress) by Hitler, to be held to the last man. Fought from 10 to 12 September 1944, the Allied objective was to secure the harbour facilities intact, to deliver supplies to the Allied armies in Continental Europe. The Allies refused to let the civilian population be evacuated, despite offers of free passage by the fortress commander.

From 26 August, Royal Navy ships and Royal Air Force aircraft carried out a blockade and an extensive preparatory bombardment of the city, which killed over 2,000 civilians and 19 German troops. The land attack was carried out by British infantry, aided by specialist armoured vehicles from the 79th Armoured Division, including Canadian troops. The German garrison of about 11,000 men surrendered on 12 September; the port was badly damaged but it was re-opened on 9 October.

Background

Invasion of Normandy

On D-Day, 6 June 1944, Allied troops landed in Normandy on the north coast of France in Operation Overlord and began the liberation of France. On D-Day, Allied aircraft laid a smoke screen off Le Havre to blind the coastal artillery; a torpedo-boat flotilla and a flotilla of patrol ships sailed from the port, using the smoke for camouflage. The German boats managed to fire 15 torpedoes off the Orne at 05:30, hit and sink  and forced several other ships to take evasive action. On 6 July, Allied ships reported an "unusual object" passing through the Trout line, the eastern flank of the invasion area. The object was fired on, launched a torpedo and sailed away. Several more objects appeared soon after, well dispersed and were also fired on. The devices managed to sink two minesweepers for a loss of nine sunk and fifteen losses from all causes of the 26 that had sailed from Le Havre; it was later found that they were Neger midget submarines of the K-Verband (Small Battle Units). On the night of  21 Neger left Le Havre and all were sunk, most of their operators being killed, for one British minesweeper sunk and the Polish cruiser ORP Dragon damaged and scuttled off Sword Beach.

June–August
RAF Bomber Command attacked Le Havre in the evening 14 June, twenty-two 617 Squadron Lancaster bombers and Mosquito target markers going first, to drop Tallboy bombs on the E-boat (Schnellboot, S-Boot [fast boat]) pens and one Tallboy penetrated the roof, which did much to eliminate the E-boat threat. The Dambusters were followed by 228 more Lancasters and three hours later a second wave of 116 aircraft arrived,  of bombs hitting the port and anti-aircraft gun positions. The operation was the largest day raid by Bomber Command since the war began.

Admiral Theodor Krancke, then Chief of Kriegsmarine Group Command West, called the raid a catastrophe and in the war diary wrote "It will be hardly possible to carry out the operations planned...since yesterday's attack on Le Havre". Some E-boats reached Le Havre in mid-June but by the end of July, only six E-boats on the channel coast were operational. The Navy formed the Support Squadron Eastern Flank, a group of small gun-armed vessels, which came inshore during the day to bombard land targets and patrolled offshore at night. The squadron fought many engagements with E-boats and K-Verband; on the night of  the Germans sent twenty Linsen (explosive motor boat) sorties, over fifty Marder (midget submarines) and several E-boat attacks with new Dackel TIIId circling torpedoes; most of the German craft were sunk. The night sorties by E-boats transferred to Le Havre after D-Day sank a Motor Torpedo Boat, two Landing Ship, Tank, three merchant ships, two landing craft and two tugs; six E-boats were sunk and ten damaged in the exchanges.

Festung Le Havre

Le Havre was the most important of the Channel Ports and second only to Marseilles amongst French ports for tonnage capacity, having  of quays capable of receiving ocean-going ships. In Operation Maple from early April, British aircraft and ships laid mines off Le Havre and the ports further north, which closed the port for long periods. In early September 1944, German troops of the 15th Army (General Gustav-Adolf von Zangen) occupied a swathe of coastal territory from the port to Bruges, which had been under attack by the First Canadian Army since the start of September. The port had water on three
sides, the Channel to the west, the valley of the Lézarde River to the east and to the south by the estuary of the Seine estuary the Canal de Tancarville. North of Le Havre, the ground rises steeply to high ground as far as the cliffs of Cap de la Hève and the coast to the north.

The Germans had dug an anti-tank ditch from the Lézarde valley past Montivilliers to the coast at Octeville-sur-Mer, covered by minefields, barbed wire and concrete defensive positions. At the crest of the southern plateau, two fortified positions covered the town and port entrance and the Grand Clos coastal artillery battery could engage approaching ships. The garrison had 115 guns, plenty of machine-guns and mortars (many of its anti-tank guns were sent to Normandy before September and lost) ammunition and supplies for 14,000 men for ninety days. Near Fontaine La Mallet lay Strongpoint 8, with several concrete gun emplacements, the first of a series to cover the northern approaches to the port. The minefields and tank obstacles had been hurriedly built and were superimposed on an earlier and unfinished scheme based on strongpoints.

Crossing the Seine

Allied invasion plans required that the First Canadian Army (General Harry Crerar) on the left flank of the 21st Army Group (General Bernard Montgomery) should cross the Seine downstream of Rouen and turn left into the Le Havre peninsula and make right-handed flanking manoeuvres to capture Le Havre and its railway connexions, Dieppe, Calais and Dunkirk, for the Allied supply effort. On the night of 26/27 August, the crossing of the Seine by the First Canadian Army began and Rouen was captured on 30 August, I Corps used every means it could improvise to get over the lower Seine which was not bridged and II Canadian Corps further upriver. The two corps were ordered to capture Le Havre and Dieppe respectively and then clear the coastal belt up to Bruges. The German 7th Army was ordered to abandon the lower Seine and by 31 August, the 15th Army to hold a line from Dieppe to Neufchâtel but the speed of the Allied advance forced a retreat to the Somme. In Operation Fusillade, Dieppe was entered unopposed by the 2nd Canadian Division on 1 September and the 51st Highland Infantry Division walked into St-Valery, four years after most of the original Highland division had been forced to surrender there. The Highlanders joined the 49th (West Riding) Division outside Le Havre on 4 September. As the Canadian Army prepared its attack on Le Havre, the seaward approaches were blockaded closely by the Allies navies from 26 August; the port was the most westerly still in German possession and the Kriegsmarine tried to run supplies in and get out the ships still afloat. During the next four nights convoys departing Le Havre were attacked and a few ships managed to slip away; nine ships were sunk and by 30 August the port was empty.

Prelude

German defences

On 14 August 1944, Colonel Hermann-Eberhard Wildermuth took command of the fortress and later put the effective strength of the garrison at around 8,000 men, from a total of more than 11,000 personnel. Wildermuth had a Festungs Stamm Abteilung (fortress cadre unit) elements of the 226th Infantry Division and 245th Infantry Division; a battalion of Security Regiment 5, marines and some naval personnel. About 50,000 French civilians remained in the port from the normal population of about 160,000 people. On 9 September, Wildermuth ordered that infantry attacks were to be resisted, even with pistols but when tanks attacked, strongpoints which had no anti-tank guns could surrender; rather than fight to the last man, the garrison was to resist until the last anti-tank gun. Before the attack, the defenders were given an ultimatum and called upon to surrender; Wildermuth countered by requesting that civilians should be evacuated, given that his orders from Hitler were to hold Festung Le Havre to the last man. Wildermuth appealed to British humanity and repeated his offer, even after the bombing campaign started but was again refused. Crocker judged that the proposed two-day truce to get the civilians out, would take too long and delay the capture of the port.

Allied preparations
A naval and air bombardment was planned to soften up the Le Havre fortifications. On 5 September, Erebus was forced temporarily out of action by a hit from the Grand Clos battery, which had  one  and two  guns; the port defences also had 44 medium and field guns and 32 anti-aircraft guns. The Bomber Command day attack on 5 September was the first of seven raids. On 10 September, about sixty bombers attacked the Grand Clos battery, followed by a bombardment from Warspite''' and Erebus'', which put the German guns out of action. Bomber Command returned in the afternoon and dropped another  of bombs as the British divisional artillery and the 4th and 9th Army Group Royal Artillery (AGRA) conducted counter-flak bombardments during the raids. The air and naval bombardments killed about 2,000 French civilians and 19 Germans.

Allied plan

During the North-west Europe Campaign (6 June 1944 – 8 May 1945), British specialist tanks were held in the 79th Armoured Division (Major-General Percy Hobart) and attached to other units for particular operations. For Astonia, the 79th Armoured Division provided the 49th Division with the 222nd Assault Squadron RE (AVRE), two Crab squadrons of the 22nd Dragoons and a Crocodile squadron of the 141st Regiment Royal Armoured Corps (141 RAC). The division also had the 34th Armoured Brigade and the 1st Canadian Armoured Carrier Regiment with 44 Kangaroos under command. In the I Corps plan, phase I had the 49th Division breaking through on the northern front capture strongpoints to the south and cross the Fontaine. In phase IIa the Highlanders would break through on the right and in IIb the 49th Division was to capture the southern plateau. In phase II the Highlanders would take the ground around Octeville and the heights north of Le Havre and in phase IV, all forces were ruthlessly to exploit opportunities to capture the town.

Assault

10 September

East of Strongpoint 8 the ditch was near the top of the slope down to the stream, with the minefield in front. The 56th Infantry Brigade (Brigadier M. S. Ekin) was to conduct the attack on the 49th Division front.The attack plan was to penetrate the German defences to allow further forces to attack, then further these gains and capture the city. An assault of two divisions began at 17:45 hours on 10 September, with naval bombardment vessels engaging the coastal batteries defending the port and RAF bombers dropping an additional  of bombs ninety minutes before zero hour. With the assistance of specialist units from the 79th Armoured Division and the 1st Canadian Armoured Carrier Regiment, such as Kangaroos and Sherman Crab vehicles, the first part of the assault proceeded swiftly, with gaps cleared through the minefield and anti-tank ditches breached. The 49th (West Riding) Infantry Division penetrated the north-eastern section of the Le Havre perimeter first, followed by the 51st (Highland) Infantry Division attacking on their right from the north. The assault was costly for the specialised armour, the heavy rains making river banks much soggier than the plateaux, slowing flails and other vehicles at their most vulnerable. 79th Armoured Division losing 34 Crab anti-mine flail tanks, two command tanks and 6 Armoured Vehicle Royal Engineers (AVRE) vehicles.

11–12 September
On the second day, the attack continued with support from Hawker Typhoons and armoured vehicles; facing the threat of Churchill Crocodile flame throwing tanks, the last outer defence strongpoints surrendered at 14:00 hours. On the third day of the assault the town centre was cleared by the infantry of both divisions, forcing the German garrison commander's official surrender at 11:45, 12 September; 11,300 German troops were captured and interned as prisoners of war.

Aftermath

Analysis
Despite the weather, the bombing greatly hampered the defence of the port and the final attack just before the ground operation began on 10 September, prompted by the experience of Operation Charnwood, caused much disorganisation among the defenders. The operation was a model combined operation in which the British advantage in set-piece attacks backed by massed firepower was efficiently exploited. Much emphasis had been placed on maintaining the momentum of the attack and good timing, the usual caution in attack being relaxed to exploit any sign that the defenders were collapsing. While there had been few Allied casualties during the operation, damage to the port infrastructure was severe,  of docks and 15,000 buildings had been destroyed but the port was open again by 9 October.  Wildermuth claimed that the lack of anti-tank guns had prevented a long defence of the port but other prisoners said that even the experience of Russia was less of an ordeal than the bombing. Because of the scandal of friendly civilian casualties, Allied forces besieging Calais allowed the civilians to be evacuated before it was attacked; Dunkirk was masked until Germany surrendered on 8 May 1945.

Casualties
In the British official history, Lionel Ellis recorded the capture of 11,300 German prisoners for fewer than 500 Allied casualties. In 1960, Charles Stacey, the Canadian official historian, gave 11,302 prisoners and 388 casualties in I Corps. In 2014, John Plant wrote that the 22nd Dragoons lost 29 of its 33 flail tanks and two command tanks, the 222nd Assault Squadron lost five AVRE and that six tanks were lost by the 7th RTR but that most of the damage had been caused by mines and was repairable, only eleven of the 22nd Dragoon losses being write-offs. About 2,000 French civilians and 19 Germans were killed in the air and naval bombardments.

Notes

References

Bibliography

Further reading

External links
 A photographic record of the storm of iron & fire; Le Havre 1944
 Refusal of Orders: the case of William Douglas Home

Operation Overlord
Battles of World War II involving Canada
Astonia
Battles of World War II involving Germany
September 1944 events
1944 in France